Pierre Sinibaldi (29 February 1924 – 24 January 2012) was a French football player and manager.

In the 1960s and again in the early 1970s, he coached R.S.C. Anderlecht with whom he previously won four Belgian Championships between 1962 and 1966. As a player for Stade de Reims (1944–1953), he won two French Championships (1949, 1953) and the French Cup (1950); in 1947, he was the top scorer in the Division 1 with 33 goals. Sinibaldi, whose brothers Paul (goalkeeper) and Noël also played in Reims, was nominated twice for the France national team, the first time for a 2–1 win against England in 1946.

Honours

Player 
Reims
 Ligue 1: 1948–49, 1952–53

Manager 
Anderlecht
 Belgian First Division: 1961–62, 1963–64, 1964–65, 1965–66
 Belgian Cup: 1964–65
 Inter-Cities Fairs Cup: runner-up 1969-70

Individual 
Reims
 Ligue 1 top scorer: 1946–47 (33 goals)

References

External links
Profile at French federation official site

1924 births
2012 deaths
French people of Italian descent
Association football forwards
French footballers
France international footballers
ES Troyes AC players
Stade de Reims players
FC Nantes players
Olympique Lyonnais players
Canet Roussillon FC players
Ligue 1 players
Ligue 2 players
French football managers
French expatriate football managers
R.S.C. Anderlecht managers
Sporting de Gijón managers
AS Monaco FC managers
UD Las Palmas managers
SC Toulon managers
Expatriate football managers in Belgium
Expatriate football managers in Spain
Luxembourg national football team managers
Sportspeople from Haute-Corse
Footballers from Corsica